Sakhr or Sakher (Arabic:  'rock' or 'boulder') may refer to:

People

Tribes
 Bani Sakher, a Bedouin tribe in Jordan

People with the name 
 Abu Sufyan ibn Harb (Sakhr ibn Harb ibn Umayya ibn Abd Shams, c. 565 — c. 653), leader of the Quraysh tribe of Mecca
 Sakher El Materi (born 1981), Tunisian businessman
 Sakher Habash (1939-2009), founding leader of Fatah
 Sakher Hattar (born 1963), Jordanian oud player
 Sakhr Abu l-Barakat (died 1221/1222), shaikh of the ‘Adawiyya Sufi order

Other uses
 MSX Sakhr AX150, a 1980s home computer 
 Sakhr Software Company, an Arabic language technology company in Kuwait

See also
 
 
 
 
 Shakir, a name
 Sakhir, an area of Bahrain
 Şakir, a Turkish name
 Saqr (disambiguation) and Sakr